DYDW (531 AM) Radyo Diwa is a Filipino radio station owned and operated by Word Broadcasting Corporation. Its studio and transmitter are located at the 2nd Floor, Modesta Bldg., Bonifacio St., Tacloban. As of now, the station went inactive due to the transmitter collapse after the 2013 Typhoon Haiyan along with DYBR.

References

Radio stations in Tacloban
Christian radio stations in the Philippines
Radio stations established in 1989